is a 2009 rhythm game created by Sega and Crypton Future Media for the PlayStation Portable. The game was first released on July 2, 2009 in Japan with no international release. The game primarily makes use of Vocaloid, a series of singing synthesizer software, and the songs created using these Vocaloids, most notably Hatsune Miku. The game is the first video game to utilize the Vocaloid software developed by the Yamaha Corporation.

In addition, Sega has released Hatsune Miku: Project DIVA Dreamy Theater, a downloadable game on the PlayStation Network for the PlayStation 3. It allows players to play Project DIVA on the PlayStation 3 with updated visuals though it requires the PlayStation Portable to be plugged into the PlayStation 3 via USB cable.

Gameplay

As the first game in the series, Project Diva has a gameplay similar to that of the series, albeit without some of the current features in the series. The game features three difficulty modes: Easy, Medium, and Hard, as opposed to the four difficulty modes of the series forgoing the Extreme difficulty, which was only added in the sequel, Hatsune Miku: Project DIVA 2nd.

Song list
There are a total of 77 songs available in Hatsune Miku: Project Diva. 36 songs are obtained normally by playing through the game, 14 songs are only available through Edit Mode, and 27 songs need to be purchased from the PlayStation Network.

Songs with a grey background can only be played in Edit Mode.
Songs with an orange background are DLC and must be purchased from the PlayStation Network.

Notes 
1.Unlocked by completing the Hatsune Miku version of this song twice on Normal difficulty, with a "Standard" or "Great" rating.

2.Unlocked by completing the Hatsune Miku version of this song three times on Normal difficulty, with a "Standard" or "Great" rating.

DLC
Two sets of DLC were released for Hatsune Miku Project Diva. The first set features Hatsune Miku and the second set features Kagamine Len, Kagamine Rin, and Megurine Luka.

DLC Set #1 - Miku Uta, Okawari
9 songs sung by Hatsune Miku
High-quality polygon PVs of all the songs (can only be viewed)
'Hello Planet' Miku 8-bit minigame
Special Miku theme for PSP XrossMediaBar (XMB) menu

DLC set #2 - Motto Okawari, Rin, Len, Luka
18 songs sung by Kagamine Len, Kagamine Rin, and Megurine Luka
High-quality polygon PVs of all the songs (can only be viewed)
'Toeto' Luka minigame
Special Len/Rin and Luka themes for PSP XMB menu

Dreamy Theater
Hatsune Miku: Project DIVA Dreamy Theater is a downloadable game for the PlayStation 3 that enables the game to be played on the console, with the use of a PlayStation Portable, that was released on June 24, 2010. The game can be downloaded from the PlayStation Store and must be installed on both the PlayStation 3 and PlayStation Portable to facilitate connectivity between the two devices. The game features exactly the same gameplay as the portable version but with upgraded graphics that are on par with an average PlayStation 3 game. The game however requires the PlayStation Portable to be plugged into the PlayStation 3 and all times whilst playing the game.

References

External links
Official Hatsune Miku: Project DIVA website 

2009 video games
Japan-exclusive video games
Music video games
PlayStation Portable games
PlayStation 3 games
Sega video games
Creative works using vocaloids
Hatsune Miku: Project DIVA games
Video games developed in Japan
Single-player video games